Mircea Vodă is a commune in Constanța County, Northern Dobruja, Romania. It is located in the central part of the county, along the Danube–Black Sea Canal.

Demographics
At the 2011 census, Mircea Vodă had 4,727 Romanians (99.24%), 28 Roma (0.59%), 6 Turks (0.13%), 2 others (0.04%).

History
Settlement in the area dates back at least to the time of the Roman Empire.  In a place that the local Turks called "Acşandemir Tabiasi", a 10th-century castrum was found, which has a stone vallum. A Slavic inscription found in this place mentions a certain "Jupan Dimitrie" and the year 943.

Villages
The following villages belong to the commune:
 Mircea Vodă (historical name: Celebichioi or Celibichioi) - named after Mircea I of Wallachia
 Gherghina (historical name: Defcea)
 Satu Nou (historical name: Enichioi)
 Țibrinu (historical name: Ceabacu)

Image gallery

References

Communes in Constanța County
Localities in Northern Dobruja